The KNVB Women's Cup is the cup competition for women's football in the Netherlands. The competition was established in 1980, along with the KNVB Amateur Cup.

From the 2007-08 season onwards, the first round of the cup is a group stage for clubs in the Hoofdklasse and the Eerste Klasse. Clubs from the Eredivisie for women join the competition in the second round.

Winners

Most wins

See also
KNVB Cup
Football in the Netherlands

References

External links
Cup at vrouwenvoetbalnederland.nl
Cup at soccerway.com

KNVB Cup
Neth
Recurring sporting events established in 1980
1
1980 establishments in the Netherlands